is a beat 'em up video game released for the Nintendo Entertainment System in 1988 in Japan, and in April 1990 in the United States. The Japanese version is based on the 1985 film, Mr. Vampire (Reigen Dōshi being the Japanese title of the film).

Gameplay
As a kung-fu master, the player must fight through eight towns filled with kyonshi (Chinese vampires), each with a unique town boss, until the final confrontation with an evil witch. An infinite amount of continues are available to complete the game.

A small selection of items, and a large selection of fighting moves, could be used on the enemy. The game also included a hidden character that made the game much more difficult, a baby kyonshi or "conshi." Instead of keeping track of available items, the game's inventory screen tabulates all the possible items in the game.

Reception
AllGame gave the game a score of 3 out of 5 stars.

References

External links
 
 Phantom Fighter at GameFAQs

1988 video games
Action video games
Nintendo Entertainment System games
Nintendo Entertainment System-only games
Side-scrolling video games
Video games about vampires
Video games based on films
Video games developed in Japan
Video games about witchcraft
Wuxia video games
Video games about zombies